L île Sainte-Thérèse (English: Sainte-Thérèse Island) is a river island of the Richelieu River. It belongs to the territory of the municipality of Saint-Jean-sur-Richelieu, in the Saint-Luc sector, in the Le Haut-Richelieu Regional County Municipality, in the region administrative Montérégie, in the south of province of Quebec, in Canada.

Geography 

It is connected to the left bank of the Richelieu River by two road bridges spanning the canal (via the pier forming the right bank of the Chambly Canal). The Baillargeon Street, which runs along the west shore of the island, is the island's main road.

The development of the Chambly Canal required the construction of a jetty in order to cut this channel at the height of the northwest part of the island.

This island faces on the west side to the rivière des Iroquois which flows into the channel passing to the west of the island.

Toponymy 
Île Sainte-Thérèse takes its name from that of Fort Sainte Thérèse, built in 1665 and now disappeared. In all likelihood, the fort would have been located opposite the small Sainte-Marie Island, downstream from Sainte-Thérèse Island.

The toponym "Île Sainte-Thérèse" was formalized on December 5, 1968 at the Place Names Bank of the Commission de toponymie du Québec.

Occupation 
The Sainte-Thérèse island, once agricultural, is now largely residential. This island is entirely built of private residences. A community center is set up in the northern part of the island.

Notes and references

See also 
Le Haut-Richelieu Regional County Municipality
Saint-Jean-sur-Richelieu
Richelieu River
Chambly Canal
List of islands of Quebec

River islands of Quebec
Le Haut-Richelieu Regional County Municipality